Speed of Life is the fifteenth studio album by Australian musician Adam Brand. The album was released on 13 March 2020. The album debuted at number 6 on the ARIA Charts.

Brand said the whole experience of making this album was "a vastly different experience to all the other albums" he has made. He said "It was a calm and stress free process and I put that down to the place in life I'm at. I felt no pressure in putting this album together... no urgency to find that big hit song... to be honest I let my heart guide me this time, and my heart was full of the wonderful notion of my baby girl who was about to be born. I whole heartedly believe she gave me that calmness and clarity in knowing what I wanted to sing about this time around."

Track listing

Charts

Release history

References

2020 albums
Adam Brand (musician) albums